Matias Viazzo (born March 6, 1983) is an Argentine rugby union footballer who plays at wing and centre where he has represented the Argentina national rugby union team. He currently plays for club Bourgoin.

References
From ercrugby.com

External links
At scrum.com

1983 births
Living people
Argentine rugby union players
Argentina international rugby union players
Rugby union centres
Rugby union wings
AS Béziers Hérault players
Tarbes Pyrénées Rugby players
Provence Rugby players
Sportspeople from Mendoza, Argentina
CS Bourgoin-Jallieu players
Argentine expatriate sportspeople in France
Argentine expatriate rugby union players
Expatriate rugby union players in France
USON Nevers players